Henry M. Vories (May 25, 1810 – October 29, 1876) was a justice of the Supreme Court of Missouri from 1873 to 1876.

Born in Henry County, Kentucky, of German descent, Vories served as a soldier in the Black Hawk War, and attempted to make a living as a storekeeper in Indiana, at which he fared poorly, going broke several times. Vories began reading law at the age of thirty-one in the office of Oliver H. Smith, and in 1844 moved to Missouri, "poor to the point of grinding poverty, but of indomitable energy". He soon became one of the leaders of the St. Joseph Bar. He moved to San Jose, California, in 1855, remaining for two years, before returning to Missouri.

On November 5, 1872, Vories was elected to a six-year term in one of several newly-established seats on the Supreme Court of Missouri, but "deteriorating health plagued most of his years on the bench", ultimately forcing his resignation on October 2, 1876. He was described as "a diligent practitioner", and "an industrious judge", though one who was "prone to set out the pleadings, evidence, and instructions at great length, — a fault that has created the impression that he lacked the faculty of expressing himself concisely".

Vories died at his home in St. Joseph, Missouri, at the age of 66.

References

1810 births
1876 deaths
People from Henry County, Kentucky
American people of the Black Hawk War
U.S. state supreme court judges admitted to the practice of law by reading law
Judges of the Supreme Court of Missouri